Ghindari is a commune in Mureș County, Romania. It lies in the Székely Land, an ethno-cultural region in eastern Transylvania.

Component villages 
The commune is composed of five villages:

Trei Sate village, in its turn, is composed of three hamlets: Cioc (Csókfalva), Hotești (Atosfalva), and Ștefănești (Székelyszentistván).

History 
Until 1918, the villages belonged to the Maros-Torda County of the Kingdom of Hungary. After the  Hungarian–Romanian War of 1918–19 and the Treaty of Trianon of 1920, the area became part of the Romania. In 2004, Chibed broke away to form an independent commune.

Demographics

The commune has an absolute Székely Hungarian majority. According to the 2011 census, it has a population of 3,250, of which 88.43% are Hungarian and 7.08% Roma.

See also 
 List of Hungarian exonyms (Mureș County)

Gallery

References

External links
   www.makfalva.eu (official website )

Communes in Mureș County
Localities in Transylvania